Mátra Solar Power Plant is a large thin-film photovoltaic (PV) power system, built on a  plot of land located in Visonta in Hungary. The solar park has around 72,480 state-of-the-art thin film PV panels for a total nameplate capacity of 16-megawatts, and was finished in November 2015.

The installation is located in the Heves County in north-eastern Hungary near Visonta. The investment cost for the Visonta solar park amounts to some 6.5 billion Hungarian forint.

This is the third largest photovoltaics producing plant in Hungary and the second largest in Northern Hungary. (until 2019)

See also

Energy policy of the European Union
Photovoltaics
Renewable energy commercialization
Renewable energy in the European Union
Solar power in Hungary

References

External links
 Mátra Power Plant

Photovoltaic power stations in Hungary